Aronia arbutifolia, called the red chokeberry, is a North American species of shrubs in the rose family. It is native to eastern Canada and to the eastern and central United States, from eastern Texas to Nova Scotia inland to Ontario, Ohio, Kentucky, and Oklahoma.

Aronia arbutifolia is a branching shrub forming clumps by means of stems forming from the roots. Flowers are white or pink, producing black or bright red fruits. The fruits, whose ill taste inspired the common name, are bitterly acidic (though edible) when eaten raw, but are high in pectin and can be used to make delicious thick jams and jellies.

It is a popular native landscaping plant.

References

External links
 

arbutifolia
Flora of Eastern Canada
Plants described in 1753
Taxa named by Carl Linnaeus
Flora of the Northeastern United States
Flora of the Southeastern United States
Flora of Oklahoma
Flora of Texas
Flora without expected TNC conservation status